Kagera Region (Mkoa wa Kagera in Swahili) is one of Tanzania's 31 administrative regions. The region is comparable in size to the land area of the Netherlands. Kagera Region is bordered to the east by Lake Victoria, Mwanza Region and Mara Region. The region is bordered to the south by Geita Region and Kigoma Region. Lastly, Kagera borders Rwanda to the west, Uganda to the north and Burundi to the south west.
The regional capital city is Bukoba. According to the 2022 national census, the region had 2,989,299, and 2012 the region had a population of 2,458,023.

Etymology 
The region derives its name from the Kagera River.

Geography 
Kagera borders Uganda to the north, Rwanda and Burundi to the west, and the Tanzanian regions Kigoma to the south and Geita to the east. The Kagera River forms the region's border with Rwanda. The region lies in the middle of 30°25' and 32°40' east, and 1°00' and 2°45' south. Much of the water is that of the great lake, Victoria, as well as lakes Ikimba, Burigi, Ngono and the Kagera River.

Climate
With an average annual rainfall of 500 to 2000 mms, the Kagera Region has a bi-modal rainfall pattern from March to May and from October to November. Rainfall varies from 2000 mm per year in Bukoba to 500 mm in the west, with rainfall being higher along Lake Victoria's coasts and decreasing inland and away from the lake as well as with height. The temperature ranges from 20 degress Celsius to 28 degrees Celsius. The area is made up of a number of hills that run parallel to the lake's edge and north to south.

Geology 
Lying on the Kivu Rift, the western of the two branches of the East African Rift which transverses Tanzania, Kagera experiences significant seismic activity. On 10 September 2016, the region was struck by a 5.9 magnitude earthquake in which 17 people died, and at least 250 others were injured.

Kagera is known for its agriculture, lush landscapes, and wildlife. It has reasonably fertile old soils but climate change has led to soil exhaustion and a need to use fertiliser.

Demographics

Population 
One of the top five most populous regions in the nation is the Kagera region. According to the population and housing Census of 2002, the region had a total population of 2,033,888, with an average growth rate of 3.1. 6.0% of all Tanzanians living on the mainland were found in the region.

History 

During colonization the region was a district called West Lake, that was a part of the Lake Province, that included the Geita, Mwanza, Shinyanga, Tabora, Simiyu, and Mara, regions. After independence Lake Province was broken up into regions, with Kagera and part of Geita becoming the West Lake Region. Following the Kagera War in 1979, the West Lake Region was renamed the Kagera Region.

For a period of about five centuries, Kagera was home to nine different kingdoms with highly hierarchical societies. Before European colonialism, coffee was a traditional crop in the area, used for its stimulant properties and in local cultural rituals. During colonial times, coffee was transformed into a cash crop. Bananas were a staple food in the region. Although there was a gender-based division of labour in the traditional Bahaya society, women of the time were not thought to be inferior to men. In fact women commanded special respect in all traditional rituals. For example, upon the death of a head of a family (Nyin'enju), during the following inheritance rituals, the "Main Inheritor" (Omusika) had to have a female counterpart selected from among his sisters to share his authority. Similarly, upon the death of a reigning king, during the crowning of the next king, there had to be a "sister to the nation" (Kinyany'engoma) who was also selected from among his sisters.

The kings lived in elaborate palaces and were respected as the direct link to gods of their kingdoms. The authority of the nine kingdoms (Kihanja, Karagwe, Kiziba, Misenye, Bugabo, Kyamtwara, Ihangiro, Bukara and Biharamulo) was diminished when Germans colonised Tanzania in 1885 and supported the Haya, the ethnic group of Bukoba and Muleba Districts over the other districts. However, the local kings held on to power. The demise of these kingdoms came after Tanzania gained its independence and president Nyerere considered them detrimental to national unity.

There was a chief called Omukama (the word meant a king or chief) who could be born with that authority. Some prominent chiefs in Kagera include Kyamukuma, who is a last chief in Misenye (currently Missenyi District). Other chiefs include Rumanyika of Karagwe, Ruhinda, Kahigi and other inferior chiefs. Kahigi is among the chiefs who waived their territories by collaborating with German colonialists.

Cultural tours are available for tourists visiting Kagera and can be accessed from the region's capital of Bukoba. These tours include visits to the region's national parks/nature reserves etc.

During German rule Dr. M. Zupitza, then serving as the local medical officer, encountered the plague outbreak in Kiziba (1897–1898). In cooperation with Dr. Robert Koch, he confirmed that the cause was the same bacteria as the outbreak in Bombay.

When authority was transferred to the British who supplanted the Germans, Kagera was open to Lutheran missionary activity. Other Christian denominations including the Roman Catholic church later arrived. Their legacy is seen in the many churches in the region.

The attempted annexation of Kagera by Uganda in 1979 triggered the Uganda–Tanzania War.

Economy
Agriculture is the main economic activity in the region. The primary crops farmed in the Kagera Region are pulses. Cereals were the most often planted crop, with 153,993 hectares (42.8% of the total area planted with annuals), followed by root and tubers with 64,261 ha (17.8%), oil seeds with 10,416 ha (2.9%), cash crops with 7,737 ha (2.1%), and fruits and vegetables with 3,558 ha (1.0%). The majority of annual cash crops were cotton. Cereal crop output in the area is dominated by maize. 302,529 households in the Kagera Region raised maize during the brief wet season, making up 93.8% of all households that raised crops during that time.

Food crop sales accounted for 54.0% of smallholder households' total cash income in the Kagera Region, with cash crop sales (18.9%), other sporadic income (8.7%), fishing (4.3%), and wages/salaries (4.3%) following.
Petty businesses were the primary source of income for only 3.4% of smallholder households, followed by the sale of livestock (2.5%), cash remittances (2.0%), sales of forest products (0.7%), and sales of animal products (0.6%).

Kagera is also one of the largest coffee producers in the country. Muleba (9,968 ha, 26%), Karagwe (8,660 ha, 23%), Ngara (3,600 ha, 10%), Biharamulo (454 ha, 1%), and Bukoba Urban (373 ha, 1%) were the other coffee-producing areas in the area, with Bukoba Rural having the highest area (14,704 ha, 39%). (Map 3.33). However, Ngara (1.23 ha) had the greatest average amount of land planted with coffee per household, followed by Karagwe(0.32 ha), Biharamulo (0.22 ha), Muleba (0.21 ha), Bukoba Rural (0.21 ha), and Bukoba Urban (0.21 ha) (0.18 ha).

Wildlife and national parks 

The Kagera Region has abundant wildlife, including baboons, giraffe, elands, crocodiles, hippopotamus, warthog. Birdlife includes  African fish eagles, hammerkops, marabou stork, cormorants. kingfishers, and herons.

Kagera is home to Biharamulo, Burigi, Ibanda and Rumanyika and Orugundu game reserves. A national park is situated on Rubondo Island and a wildlife sanctuary is based on Saa Nane Island. In 2019,  Burigi, Biharamulo game reserve, and Lakes Burigi and Kimis were upgraded to become a national park with the Burigi-Chato National Park. Rumanyika was gazetted as Rumanyika Karagwe National Park and Ibanda Kyerwa National Park.

Administrative divisions

Districts 
Kagera Region is divided into eight districts, each administered by a council:

In 2016 the Tanzania National Bureau of Statistics report there were 2,789,577 people in the region, from 2,458,023 in 2012.

References

External links 

 
 United Republic of Tanzania: Kagera Region
 Kagera Region Homepage for the 2002 Tanzania National Census
 Tanzanian Government Directory Database

 
Regions of Tanzania